San Bernardo is a village in Baja California Sur, Mexico.

References

Populated places in Baja California Sur